Beytullah Kayışdağ  is a Turkish Greco-Roman wrestler competing in the 97 kg division of Greco-Roman wrestling. He is a member of the Ankara ASKI Spor Club.

Career 
Beytullah Kayışdağ, competing in Greco-Roman wrestling 97 kilograms category, won a bronze medal the 2019 World Junior Wrestling Championships, which was held in Estonian capital of Tallinn. Beytullah Kayışdağ drew 1-1 with Hungarian Aleks Szoke, was declared the winner of the match due to receiving the last point, became the third in the world and won the bronze medal.

In 2022, he won one of the bronze medals in his event at the Vehbi Emre & Hamit Kaplan Tournament held in Istanbul, Turkey. He competed in the 97 kg event at the European Wrestling Championships in Budapest, Hungary where he was eliminated in his second match. A few months later, he competed at the Matteo Pellicone Ranking Series 2022 held in Rome, Italy.  He won one of the bronze medals in the men's Greco-Roman 97 kg event at the 2021 Islamic Solidarity Games held in Konya, Turkey.

References

External links
 

Living people
Turkish male sport wrestlers
1999 births
Islamic Solidarity Games competitors for Turkey
Islamic Solidarity Games medalists in wrestling
21st-century Turkish people